Honeymoon is a 1956 Soviet comedy film directed by Nadezhda Kosheverova.

Plot 
Lyuda  Odintsova, a graduate of the medical institute, called for engineer Aleksei Rybalchenko to stay in Leningrad after distribution. But unexpectedly, Aleksei agreed to work in Siberia, and poor Lyudochka had to follow her husband to a Siberian construction site and begin her working career as a doctor in a tiny medical center of a working village.

Cast 
 Lyudmila Kasatkina as Lyuda  Odintsova
 Pavel Kadochnikov as Aleksei Rybalchenko
 Tatyana Pankova as Anna Terentyevna
 Pavel Sukhanov as Ivan Terentevich
 Zoya Fyodorova as Elizaveta Povariha
 Sergey Filippov as ferryman
 Ekaterina Savinova as Zoya
 Anatoli Abramov		
 Valentin Abramov
 Kirill Lavrov

Release 
Nadezhda Kosheverova's film was watched by 26.5 million Soviet viewers, which is the 458 result in the entire history of the Soviet film distribution.

References

External links 
 

1956 films
1950s Russian-language films
Soviet romantic comedy films
1956 romantic comedy films
Lenfilm films
Films directed by Nadezhda Kosheverova